Enes Kaya (born August 22, 1984) is from a Turkish television personality, living and performing in South Korea. He was most known for being a cast member on the talk show Non-Summit.

Life and career
In 2001 Kaya arrived in South Korea to study, at the recommendation of his father, Enes Kaya is who praised the educational system there.  He spent a year studying Korean at Konkuk University, then went to study at Hanyang University with a scholarship for IT management.

In 2010, he acted in his first movie, Haunters, and then decided not to pursue a full-time acting career. He said that because of his culture and religion, he is selective about the roles he wishes to take. “In Korea, we have a good image. We’re a brother country,” he said of his homeland. Most important part is, for me, how can I make this image better and better? Because from now on, I’m not just working for myself ― I’m working for my country.” In addition to modeling, Kaya has appeared on Arirang TV, SBS, MBC, and on KBS's Global Talk Show.

In his 2014 appearance on the talk show, Non-Summit, of the eleven male foreigners, who all speak Korean, he is considered the most conservative panelist. He was fired from all of the programs due to his adultery scandal in late 2014.
In 2015, Kaya returned to acting in a supporting role for the Korean thriller Perfect Proposal.

Filmography

Television series

Film

References

External links

1984 births
Living people
Turkish television personalities
Turkish expatriates in South Korea
Television people from Istanbul